The hierarchical equations of motion (HEOM) technique derived by Yoshitaka Tanimura and Ryogo Kubo in 1989, is a non-perturbative approach developed to study the evolution of a density matrix  of quantum dissipative systems. The method can treat system-bath interaction non-perturbatively as well as non-Markovian noise correlation times without the hindrance of the typical assumptions that conventional Redfield (master) equations suffer from such as the Born, Markovian and rotating-wave approximations. HEOM is applicable even at low temperatures where quantum effects are not negligible.

The hierarchical equation of motion for a system in a harmonic Markovian bath is

Hierarchical equations of motion 

HEOMs are developed to describe the time evolution of the density matrix  for an open quantum system. It is a non-perturbative, non-Markovian approach to propagating in time a quantum state. Motivated by the path integral formalism presented by Feynman and Vernon, Tanimura derive the HEOM from a combination of statistical and quantum dynamical techniques.
Using a two level spin-boson system Hamiltonian

Characterising the bath phonons by the spectral density 

By writing the density matrix in path integral notation and making use of Feynman–Vernon influence functional, all the bath coordinates in the interaction terms can be grouped into this influence functional which in some specific cases can be calculated in closed form. Assuming a high temperature heat bath with the Drude spectral distribution   and taking the time derivative of the path integral form density matrix the equation and writing it in hierarchal form yields

where  destroys system excitation and hence can be referred to as the relaxation operator.

As with the Kubo's stochastic Liouville equation in hierarchal form, the counter  can go up to infinity which is a problem numerically, however Tanimura and Kubo provide a method by which the infinite hierarchy can be truncated to a finite set of  differential equations where  is determined by some constraint sensitive to the characteristics of the system i.e. frequency, amplitude of fluctuations, bath coupling etc. The "Terminator" defines the depth of the hierarchy. A simple relation to eliminate the  term is found. . With this terminator the hierarchy is closed at the depth  of the hierarchy by the final term:

.

The statistical nature of the HEOM approach allows information about the bath noise and system response to be encoded into the equation of motion doctoring the infinite energy problem of Kubo's SLE by introducing the relaxation operator ensuring a return to equilibrium.

Computational cost

When the open quantum system is represented by  levels and  baths with each bath response function represented by  exponentials, a hierarchy with  layers will contain:

matrices, each with  complex-valued (containing both real and imaginary parts) elements. Therefore, the limiting factor in HEOM calculations is the amount of RAM required, since if one copy of each matrix is stored, the total RAM required would be:

bytes (assuming double-precision).

Implementations
The HEOM method is implemented in a number of freely available codes. A number of these are at the website of Yoshitaka Tanimura including a version for GPUs  which used improvements introduced by David Wilkins and Nike Dattani. The nanoHUB version provides a very flexible implementation. An open source parallel CPU implementation is available from the Schulten group.

See also
 Quantum master equation
 Open quantum system
 Fokker–Planck equation
 Quantum dynamical semigroup
 Quantum dissipation

References

Quantum mechanics